Isaac M. Powers House is a historic home located at Wallace, Duplin County, North Carolina. It was built about 1878, and is a one-story, single pile, three bay, frame dwelling with Greek Revival style design elements. A former rear ell was destroyed by fire in 1979. Also on the property are the contributing smokehouse. It was the home of Reverend Isaac Powers (1850-1936), one of the first African-American landowners in Duplin County.

It was listed on the National Register of Historic Places in 1999.

References

African-American history of North Carolina
Houses on the National Register of Historic Places in North Carolina
Greek Revival houses in North Carolina
Houses completed in 1878
Houses in Duplin County, North Carolina
National Register of Historic Places in Duplin County, North Carolina